The Littfe  is a river of North Rhine-Westphalia, Germany in the township of Kreuztal (Westphalia). The well is southeast of Welschen-Ennest (a part of Kirchhundem) in the village of Burgholdinghausen. Littfe flows through Littfeld, the village that has got its name by the river, Krombach and Eichen. In the centre of Kreuztal it flows into the river Ferndorfbach.

Origin of the name

The name's origin is built by the Celtic words Let and apha, which mean loam and water.

See also
List of rivers of North Rhine-Westphalia

References

Rivers of North Rhine-Westphalia
Rivers of Siegerland
Rivers of Germany